3CR may refer to:

3CR (Melbourne), a community radio station, broadcasting on the AM band in Melbourne, Australia
3 Colours Red, a hard rock band
BBC Three Counties Radio, a local radio station in England
Third Cambridge Catalogue of Radio Sources, the revised third Cambridge catalogue of astronomical radio sources